Vietsenia is a genus of flowering plants belonging to the family Melastomataceae.

Its native range is Vietnam.

Species:
 Vietsenia laxiflora C.Hansen 
 Vietsenia poilanei C.Hansen 
 Vietsenia rotundifolia C.Hansen 
 Vietsenia scaposa C.Hansen

References

Melastomataceae
Melastomataceae genera